"The Newry Highwayman" is a traditional Irish or British folk song about a criminal's life, deeds, and death. It is also found in Ireland, the USA and Canada with titles such as "Rambling Boy" and "Rude And Rambling Man". The earliest known version is from 1788, likely printed by John Brown, in a chapbook entitled "The irish robbers's [sic] adventure. To which is added An Elegy on the Death of Captain Allen." The earliest broadside is from 1824 (Bodleian Harding B 25(2054)). Some versions mention "Mansfield" and this is sometimes taken to be William Murray, first Earl of Mansfield (1706-1793). The 1788 version mentions "Reddans Town" instead of Newry, though the rest of the song is nearly identical to later versions. British variants are generally classified as Roud 490; American variants are classified as Laws L12.

Other titles for this song include:
 Wild and Wicked Youth
 The Flash Lad
 In Newry Town
 Newlyn Town
 The Rambling Boy
 The Roving Blade
 Adieu Adieu
 The Irish Robber

Recordings

British and Irish variants
 Tommy Makem and Liam Clancy on their 1978 album Two for the Early Dew.
 The Dubliners on their 1983 album Prodigal Sons 
 Four to the Bar on their 1995 album Another Son.
 Waterson–Carthy sang it on Fishes and Fine Yellow Sand as "Newry Town"
 The Watersons sang it on For Pence and Spicy Ale as "Adieu Adieu"
 Brass Monkey sang it on Sound and Rumour as "The Flash Lad"
 The Yetties sang it on "A Load Old Bales" as "Adieu Adieu"
 Eliza Carthy sang it on "Red" (1998) as "Adieu Adieu"
 Solas performed it on their first self-titled album and again on their 2006 album 'Reunion: A Decade of Solas.
 Fairport Convention on their 1977 album The Bonny Bunch of Roses as "Adieu Adieu"

American variants
 The Carolina Tar Heels "Rude & Rambling Man" 1929.
 The Carter Family "The Rambling Boy" 1941.
 Wade Mainer "Ramblin' Boy 1941.
 Joan Baez "Rake And Rambling Boy" 1960.
 Boiled in Lead on their 1994 album Antler Dance.
 New Lost City Ramblers "Rambling Boy" 1963.
 Myers Family and Friends "The Rambling Boy" 2007.
 Bob Dylan has occasionally performed the song live as "Newry Highwayman" or "Roving Blade"
 Runa recorded a version of "The Newry Highwayman" on their 2011 album "Stretched on Your Grave".

References

External references 

 Columbia State University
 Newry Town

Newry Highwayman, The
Newry Highwayman, The